This is a list of stone circles located in the Scottish Borders council area of Scotland. The Royal Commission on the Ancient and Historical Monuments of Scotland records 16 stone circles in the Scottish Borders. Of these, three are marked as 'possible'. Aubrey Burl's gazetteer lists the same number: 2 in Berwickshire; 2 in Peebleshire; 10 in Roxburghshire; and 2 in Selkirkshire.

The best preserved sites are the following:
 Borrowston Rig
 Burgh Hill
 Five Stanes
 Harestanes
 Ninestane Rig
 Yadlee

See also 
Stone circles in the British Isles and Brittany
List of stone circles in Dumfries and Galloway
List of stone circles

References 

Stone circles in the Scottish Borders
Border